Major-General Sir Percival Spearman Wilkinson  (5 July 1865 – 4 November 1953) was a British Army officer who served as colonel of the Northumberland Fusiliers.

Military career
Wilkinson was commissioned into the 5th Regiment of Foot on 10 November 1883. He became Inspector General of the Royal West African Frontier Force in 1909. Promoted to major-general on 8 August 1912, he served as Commander of the 1st Secunderabad Infantry Brigade, part of the 9th (Secunderabad) Division, on internal security duties in India and then served as General Officer Commanding 50th (Northumbrian) Division on the Western Front from August 1915 until February 1918 during the First World War. He returned to command 50th (Northumbrian) Division as a peacetime formation in the UK in July 1919 before he retired on 4 July 1923. In retirement he was Chief Commissioner of St. John Ambulance.

He was colonel of the Northumberland Fusiliers from January 1915 to July 1935.

References

Sources

|-

|-

 

1865 births
1953 deaths
British Army major generals
British Army generals of World War I
Royal Northumberland Fusiliers officers
Royal West African Frontier Force officers
Knights Commander of the Order of St Michael and St George
Companions of the Order of the Bath
Military personnel from County Durham